Saccharomyces is a genus of fungi that includes many species of yeasts. Saccharomyces is from Greek σάκχαρον (sugar) and μύκης (fungus) and means sugar fungus. Many members of this genus are considered very important in food production. It is known as the brewer's yeast or baker's yeast. They are unicellular and saprotrophic fungi. One example is Saccharomyces cerevisiae, which is used in making bread, wine, and beer, and for human and animal health. Other members of this genus include the wild yeast Saccharomyces paradoxus that is the closest relative to S. cerevisiae, Saccharomyces bayanus, used in making wine, and Saccharomyces cerevisiae var. boulardii, used in medicine.

Morphology
Colonies of Saccharomyces grow rapidly and mature in three days. They are flat, smooth, moist, glistening or dull, and cream in color. The inability to use nitrate and ability to ferment various carbohydrates are typical characteristics of Saccharomyces.

Cellular morphology
Generally, they have a diameter of 2-8 μm and length of 3-25 μm.
Blastoconidia (cell buds) are observed. They are unicellular, globose, and ellipsoid to elongate in shape. Multilateral (multipolar) budding is typical. Pseudohyphae, if present, are rudimentary. Hyphae are absent.

Saccharomyces produces ascospores, especially when grown on V-8 medium, acetate ascospor agar, or Gorodkowa medium. These ascospores are globose and located in asci. Each ascus contains 1-4 ascospores. Asci do not rupture at maturity. Ascospores are stained with Kinyoun stain and ascospore stain. When stained with Gram stain, ascospores appear Gram-negative, while vegetative cells appear Gram-positive.

History
The presence of yeast in beer was first suggested in 1680, although the genus was not named Saccharomyces until 1837. It was not until 1876 that Louis Pasteur demonstrated the involvement of living organisms in fermentation and in 1883, Emil C. Hansen isolated brewing yeast and propagated the culture, leading to the discovery of the importance of yeast in brewing. The use of microscopes for the study of yeast morphology and purity was crucial to understanding their functionality.

Use in brewing

Brewing yeasts are polyploid and belong to the genus Saccharomyces. The brewing strains can be classified into two groups; the ale strains (Saccharomyces cerevisiae) and the lager strains (Saccharomyces pastorianus or Saccharomyces carlsbergensis in the old taxonomy). Lager strains are a hybrid strain of S. cerevisiae and S. eubayanus and are often referred to as bottom fermenting. In contrast, ale strains are referred to as top fermenting strains, reflecting their separation characteristics in open square fermenters. Although the two species differ in a number of ways, including their response to temperature, sugar transport and use, the S. pastorianus and S. cerevisiae species are closely related within the genus Saccharomyces.

Saccharomyces yeasts can form symbiotic matrices with bacteria, and are used to produce kombucha, kefir and ginger beer.
Saccharomyces fragilis, for example, is part of kefir cultures and is being grown on the lactose contained in whey (as a byproduct in cheesemaking) to be used as animal fodder itself.

Pathology
Saccharomyces cause food spoilage of sugar-rich foods, such as maple sap, syrup, concentrated juices and condiments. Case report suggest extended exposure to S. cerevisiae can result in hypersensitivity.

See also
Mating of yeast
Saccharomyces cerevisiae virus L-A
Schizosaccharomyces pombe (fission yeast)

References

External links
Saccharomyces at Milk the Funk Wiki
Saccharomyces Genome Database

 
Ascomycota genera
Gut flora
Yeasts used in brewing
Taxa described in 1838
Taxa named by Franz Meyen